John Byron (1723–1786) was a Royal Navy vice-admiral.

John Byron may also refer to:

Sir John Byron (died 1450) (1386–1450), MP for Lincolnshire and Lancashire
Sir John Byron (died 1567) (1488–1567), MP for Nottinghamshire 
Sir John Byron (died 1600) (c. 1526–1600), son of the preceding
Sir John Byron (died 1623) (1562–1623), son of the preceding, great-great-grandfather of the admiral
John Byron, 1st Baron Byron (1599–1652), English Royalist, son of the preceding
John Byron (British Army officer) (1756–1791), father of the poet Lord Byron, son of the admiral

See also
John Byron Nelson, American golfer